Unimed may refer to:

 Unimed (organization), a Brazilian medical work cooperative and health insurance operator
 Unimed S.A., a Swiss biomedical engineering company 
  or Mediterranean Universities Union
 UNIMED, abbreviation for the State University of Medan in Indonesia
 UniMed or Universal Medicine, an esoteric healing and occult organization in Australia and the UK